The , sometimes the "Japanese Association for Preservation of Birds", was founded in 1947, incorporating ten years later, and becoming a Public Interest Incorporated Foundation in 2012. The Society's purpose is "to protect wildlife primarily birds, to promote its conservation, and to contribute to the preservation of biodiversity".

See also
 List of Ramsar sites in Japan
 Wildlife Protection Areas in Japan
 Japan–Australia Migratory Bird Agreement
 Wild Bird Society of Japan
 List of birds of Japan

References

External links
  Japanese Society for Preservation of Birds
  Japanese Society for Preservation of Birds 

Ornithological organizations
Bird conservation organizations
1947 establishments in Japan
Environmental organizations based in Japan